WEC 22: The Hitman was a mixed martial arts event held on July 28, 2006. WEC 22 was also known as the Ryan Bennett Memorial Card in memory of the sportscaster and MMA journalist who died two months prior to the event.

Results

See also
 World Extreme Cagefighting
 List of World Extreme Cagefighting champions
 List of WEC events
 2006 in WEC

External links
Official WEC website
Sherdog events page

World Extreme Cagefighting events
2006 in mixed martial arts
Mixed martial arts in California
Sports in Lemoore, California
2006 in sports in California